Orthogonius brevithorax is a species of ground beetle in the subfamily Orthogoniinae. It was described by Pierre François Marie Auguste Dejean in 1825.

References

brevithorax
Beetles described in 1825